James Spens may refer to:

 James Spens (British Army officer) (1853–1934), English cricketer
 James Spens (diplomat) (died 1632), Scottish adventurer and diplomat